A launch capsule is a device used to propel a submarine-launched missile to the ocean surface. Upon reaching the ocean surface, the launch capsule is jettisoned, and the missile continues its journey, propelled by its booster motor.

Naval weapons